Marie-Julie Jahenny  (Coyault, Blain, 12 February 1850 – La Fraudais, 4 March 1941) was a Breton mystic and stigmatist.

Life
Marie-Julie Jahenny was born in a large peasant family, to Charles Jahenny and Marie Boya Jahenny and later joined the Third Order of Saint Francis.

During her life, she reported several apparitions of the Blessed Virgin Mary and Jesus Christ through which she received prophecies about the end of the world, the Great Catholic Monarch, punishment for the sins of the people, the destruction of Paris through civil war, the Three Days of Darkness, and the coming of the Antichrist.

From the age of twenty-three until her death, she bore the stigmata.  According to the testimony of witnesses, she experienced miraculous Holy Communions, miraculous fasting periods to where she lived on no other food but the Eucharist for several years, suffered supernatural attacks from the devil, and had the gift of prophecy and miracles.

Marie-Julie predicted numerous chastisements for sin that would fall first on France then spread to the rest of the world.  These include: earthquakes, unprecedented destruction through storms, failed harvests, unknown plagues that would spread rapidly plus the cures for them, a "Blood Rain" that would fall for seven weeks, civil war in France that apparently would be started by conspirators in the government, the persecution of the Catholic Church with the total closure of all churches and religious houses, persecution and slaughter of Christians, the destruction of Paris, a Two Day period of Darkness that would come circa a month before the Three Days of Darkness. The coming of the Great Monarch would also be announced by signs in the sky. She also had visions of the Angelic Pontiff who would reign at the same time of the Great Monarch, and that both these great leaders were destined to restore the Catholic Church. Her house has been transformed into  a sanctuary, which bears her name, in Blain, near Nantes where she is buried in the cemetery.

In her apparitions, Jahenny was told to promote a Purple Scapular, which was to be displayed in homes and worn to provide protection during the End Times and the Three Days of Darkness.

See also

 Visions of Jesus and Mary

References

Sources
 Marquis de La Franquerie: Julie Marie Jahenny: The Breton Stigmatist. 1977. PDF E-Book: 
 Marquis de La Franquerie Saint Remi, thaumaturge Apôtre et des Francs. 1981.  .
 "We Are Warned: The Prophecies of Marie-Julie Jahenny" (December 1, 2011). PDF E-Book on Academia.edu: 
 'Marie-Julie Jahenny, he 'Breton' Stigmatist: Her Life and Prophecies.'  Article:Mystics of the Church

1850 births
1941 deaths
19th-century apocalypticists
19th-century French nuns
20th-century apocalypticists
20th-century French nuns
Stigmatics
Marian visionaries